Tibbermuir railway station served the village of Tibbermore, Perth and Kinross, Scotland, from 1859 to 1951 on the Perth, Almond Valley and Methven Railway.

History 
The station opened as Tibbermuir Crossing in February 1859 by the Scottish North Eastern Railway. To the south was a siding which had a loading bank and was later looped. The station's name was changed to Tibbermuir in 1938. It closed on 1 October 1951.

References

External links 

Disused railway stations in Perth and Kinross
Railway stations in Great Britain opened in 1859
Railway stations in Great Britain closed in 1951
1859 establishments in Scotland
1951 disestablishments in Scotland